The 1957–58 SK Rapid Wien season was the 60th season in club history.

Squad

Squad and statistics

Squad statistics

Fixtures and results

League

European Cup

References

1957-58 Rapid Wien Season
Rapid